Mysolaelaps is a genus of mites in the family Laelapidae.

Species
 Mysolaelaps alpinus Guo-Tianyu, Pan-Fenggeng & Yan-G, 1999     
 Mysolaelaps parvispinosus Fonseca, 1935

References

Laelapidae